Guanshaling Subdistrict is a subdistrict of Yuelu District in Changsha, Hunan, China. The subdistrict of Guanshaling has three villages and 13 communities under its jurisdiction, its administrative office is at Juzhou Xinyuan Community.

History
The local Chinese word "Guansha" means "Looking at Changsha", "Ling" means "hill" or "mount."  In the old days, it was a hillock in the place close to the Xiang River, Changsha City can be seen here, it was named after that. The subdistrict was established from a portion of the former Yuelushan Township in 1998.

Geography
Guanshaling is located in the northeastern corner of Yuelu District. It is bordered by Yueliangdao Subdistrict of Wangcheng District to the north, Wangyue Subdistrict to the west, Yinpenling Subdistrict to the south, the Xiang River to the east.

Subdivisions
The subdistrict of Guanshaling has nine communities and three villages under its jurisdiction.

9 communities
 Changwang community
 Jinling Community
 Juzhou Xinyuan Community
 Sanchaji Community
 Shijiagang Community
 Shilingtang Community
 Tucheng Community
 Yuebei Community
 Yulong Community

3 villages
 Chazishan Village
 Guanshaling Village
 Yuehua Village

External links
 Official Website （Chinese / 中文）
 yuelu.gov （Chinese / 中文）

References

Yuelu District
Subdistricts of Changsha